Sorkheh Dizaj (also Romanized as Sorkheh Dīzaj; also known as Sorkh Dīzaj, Sorkheh Dīzaj-e Solţānīyeh, Surkha-Dizadzh, and Surkha Dīzaj) is a village in Soltaniyeh Rural District, Soltaniyeh District, Abhar County, Zanjan Province, Iran. At the 2006 census, its population was 758, in 170 families.

References 

Populated places in Abhar County